Joshua Putze (born 2 December 1994) is a German footballer who plays as a midfielder for Energie Cottbus.

References

External links
 

1994 births
Living people
Footballers from Berlin
German footballers
Association football midfielders
FC Energie Cottbus II players
FC Energie Cottbus players
Berliner FC Dynamo players
Sportfreunde Lotte players
FSV Union Fürstenwalde players
2. Bundesliga players
3. Liga players
Regionalliga players